Markus Schleicher (born 6 August 1967) is a German former racing cyclist.

Major results
Sources:
1985
 1st  Road race, National Junior Road Championships
1989
 1st Overall Mainfranken-Tour
1990
 1st Stage 4 Tour of Ireland
 6th GP Deutsche Weinstrasse
 8th (TTT) GP de la Libération 
 10th Druivenkoers Overijse
1991
 1st Omloop Schelde–Durme
 1st Circuit Escaut–Durme
 8th Overall Tour of Sweden

References

External links

1967 births
Living people
German male cyclists
People from Fulda
Sportspeople from Kassel (region)
Cyclists from Hesse